Alexandra Moreno Piraquive (born 23 August 1969) is a Colombian lawyer and politician, who served as  Senator of Colombia from 2002 to 2014.

Moreno is a co-founder of the Independent Movement of Absolute Renovation (MIRA), a conservative social and political party, of which she has been vice president and president. In 2013, she was ranked as one of the 50 most powerful and influential women of Colombia by Dinero magazine.

Career
In 2000 Moreno and fellow neo-Pentecostal leader, Carlos Alberto Baena López, founded the Independent Movement of Absolute Renovation (MIRA), a conservative social and political party. She became vice president of the party until 2003, when she became president, a post she held until 2008.

In the 2002 parliamentary elections, Moreno led the electoral list of the MIRA party to the Senate of Colombia, obtaining 81,060 votes, or 0.9% of the total votes that granted the party one seat to the Senate, which Moreno as head of the electoral list took becoming Senator of Colombia on 20 July 2002. Moreno was re-elected as Senator in 2006, and 2010.

Personal life
Alexandra was born on 23 August 1969 to Luis Eduardo Moreno and María Luisa Piraquive.
She attended Colegio Marillac in Bogotá and went on to attend Saint Thomas Aquinas University where she graduated a lawyer with concentration in Commercial Law. She later attended Universidad Externado de Colombia where she obtained specialization in Territorial Entities Management. She holds a master's degree in economic law from the Pontifical Xavierian University.

References

1969 births
Colombian Pentecostals
Colombian women in politics
20th-century Colombian lawyers
Colombian women lawyers
Independent Movement of Absolute Renovation politicians
Living people
Members of the Church of God Ministry of Jesus Christ International
Members of the Senate of Colombia
Politicians from Bogotá
Saint Thomas Aquinas University alumni
Pontifical Xavierian University alumni